Donald W. Longmuir is an American politician.

Longmuir received a Bachelor of Science from North Dakota State University. He served for more than two decades on the Stanley, North Dakota school board and, in 2016, was elected to the North Dakota House of Representatives.

He is a member of the North Dakota Republican Party.

References

Living people
Republican Party members of the North Dakota House of Representatives
North Dakota State University alumni
Year of birth missing (living people)
21st-century American politicians